Lincoln Community School (LCS) is a private school in Accra, Ghana, West Africa.  It is a non-profit, college-preparatory, international school. There is an expatriate population associated with the various embassies, Foreign Service agencies, NGO's, United Nations organisations, and international businesses. Lincoln Community School is an International Baccalaureate World School offering the Primary Years, Middle Years and Diploma Programs. The school has a large number of students whose parents are Ghanaian nationals. 25% of the students are Americans, 8% are Ghanaians, and 67% are from other countries. English is the language of instruction. Classes are offered from Pre-school through to grade 12. The school year is divided into 2 semesters (August–December & January–June) and additionally into quarterly assessment periods. It was established in 1968.

Accreditations 
Lincoln Community School is authorised by the International Baccalaureate (IB) It is accredited by the Middle States Association of Colleges and Schools (MSA), The Council of International Schools (CIS) and is a member of The Association of International Schools in Africa (AISA).

Facilities 

The school has 78 classrooms including art rooms, science labs, technology labs, music rooms, a visual and performing arts center, junior and senior school libraries, an early childhood center, and office space for guidance and administration. Sports facilities include a multipurpose hall, playground, a multipurpose court, 2 fields and a swimming pool, a gymnasium, a stage, and dressing room facilities. Playground space includes 2 playing fields with recreational apparatus and a playground with a multipurpose court. There are three libraries (HUBs), one for the Elementary School, one for Middle School and another for High School.

Enrollment 
For 2021-2022, the student population was 590 students from 60 countries.

Faculty 
In 2011, there were 68 faculty members, including 26 U.S. citizens, 19 host-country nationals, 18 third-country nationals, and 5 U.K. citizens. There were also 25 teaching assistants.

Organization 
The School is governed by a 9-member Board of Directors. Members of the LCS Parent Association elect 6 directors for a two-year term and three directors are appointed by the U.S. Ambassador.

See also 

 African-Americans in Ghana

References

External links 
 http://www.lincoln.edu.gh

American international schools in Ghana
High schools in Ghana
International Baccalaureate schools in Ghana
Schools in Accra
Educational institutions established in 1968
1968 establishments in Ghana